Graham Derek Goode (born 24 February 1949) is a former racing driver and car tuning specialist.

Goode worked as an engineer for Broadspeed alongside his contemporary Andy Rouse, before he won the Forward Trust Saloon Car Championship in a self built Ford Anglia in 1974. He founded his own preparation company, Graham Goode Performance Centre in 1976, specialising in Ford vehicles.

BTCC career 

After winning several championships in national motorsport, Goode moved up to the British Saloon Car Championship in 1984 driving his own company's Nissan Bluebird. Results came quickly, with several wins scored and a 3rd place in class in his first season. The following season saw another competitive showing. Taking advantage of his relationship with Ford, Goode was one of the first drivers to race the Ford Sierra RS500 in 1987, in fact taking the type's first ever victory. Goode continued his relationship with the RS500 in the following seasons, building his own cars independently to race in the series. He expanded and ran his team with Listerine sponsorship and took on Sean Walker and Mike Newman as drivers alongside himself. While the team's results were solid, Goode could not repeat his earlier good form. Ford were not investing in any one team and without sufficient funds, results were hard to come by.

Following the switch from the class system to the super touring regulations in 1991, Goode ran the car for Andy Middlehurst, and despite having very little money, managed to have a competitive season. Goode left the BTCC and began racing in the far east, winning races in Malaysia.

Graham Goode Performance Centre 

Today, Goode continues to run his car preparation business, based in Leicestershire. Employing 25 people, the company offers performance parts, tuning and restoration of Ford, Subaru and Mitsubishi vehicles.

Racing record

Complete British Saloon / Touring Car Championship results
(key) (Races in bold indicate pole position) (Races in italics indicate fastest lap – 1 point awarded ?–1989 in class)

† Events with 2 races staged for the different classes.

‡ Docked 20 points for technical infringements.

References 

1949 births
Living people
British Touring Car Championship drivers